Joseph Jonathan Riggs (born September 23, 1982) is an American professional bare-knuckle boxer and former mixed martial artist who is currently signed to Bare Knuckle Fighting Championship. A professional competitor since 2001, Riggs formerly competed for the UFC, WEC, Strikeforce, Bellator, ProElite, M-1 Global, and King of the Cage. Riggs is the former WEC Middleweight Champion.

Background
Born in Sanford, Maine and raised in Phoenix, Arizona, Riggs began boxing as a child with his father. Although Riggs is right handed, he was encouraged by his boxing coach to fight southpaw, making his power hand his left hand. Riggs began wrestling at Cactus High School in Glendale, Arizona. He followed in the footsteps of his hero, Randy Couture, and became an All-American twice, at Glendale Community College (Arizona), where he studied to get a Criminal Justice degree. Riggs has trained at Arizona Combat Sports under the Lally brothers, MMA Lab under John Crouch and TNT Training Center under Scott Tannenbaum.

Mixed martial arts career

Early career
Riggs made his professional mixed martial arts debut in 2001 and compiled a record of 13–3 with one no contest before being signed by the WEC.

UFC and WEC
Riggs made his WEC debut at WEC 9 against Alex Stiebling, in what was also his debut at Light Heavyweight. Riggs lost via triangle choke submission in the second round. But after the fight people started to take notice of Riggs. Although he lost the fight, he battered Stiebling so badly that after the fight he had to be helped out of the cage and taken to a hospital.  Reports said that almost everyone at ring side had Stiebling's blood on both them and their paperwork. The promoter Scott Adams said the fight could and should have been stopped at several points in the fight, leading it to be known as one of the most brutal fights in WEC history. After that he went down to middle weight to fight Isidro Gonzalez in the WEC. Where Riggs finished the fight early in the 1st Round by TKO. After his impressive victory over Gonzalez the WEC gave him a shot at the vacant Middleweight Title against the undefeated Rob Kimmons. Riggs put on a very impressive performance by stopping Kimmons early in the 1st round, earning him the WEC world title, which he held for the next 2 years.

Riggs' dream of fighting in the UFC materialized in 2004, in a winning bout against Canadian fighter Joe Doerksen. After that Riggs moved down to Welter Weight to fight veteran Chris "Lights Out" Lytle. Riggs went on to win the fight by 2nd-round TKO. And was the 1st and only man to ever stop the very popular battler Chris Lytle. Then after being named the UFCs number 1 Welter Weight contender. Riggs received his shot at the UFC Welterweight Championship at UFC 56 in November 2005 against Matt Hughes. He was originally supposed to face the winner of the upcoming title fight. But got called to fight just a month after the defeating Lytle in UFC 55 to face long time champion Hughes for the UFC Welter Weight title.

Originally, the title shot was offered to Karo Parisyan, who had to withdraw due to a torn hamstring. When Riggs was contacted to take Parisyan's place he jumped at the chance, despite having fought at UFC 55 just a month earlier. However, Riggs did not make the required weight and the fight was declared a non-title event, due to Hughes allowing Riggs to fight him (if a fighter does not make weight for a match, the match may still take place if their opponent allows it). Despite his efforts, Riggs could not mount a significant challenge; Hughes took him down and submitted him with a kimura from half-guard just minutes into the first round of the fight.

Following his loss to Hughes, Riggs rebounded to win against future longtime Strikeforce Welterweight Champion, Nick Diaz via decision at UFC 57. In the hospital room after the fight, Diaz and Riggs got into a physical altercation where they had to be separated by police.

Riggs then moved up to Middleweight to face The Ultimate Fighter alumnus Mike Swick. Early in the fight Riggs was caught in a guillotine choke and tapped out. Riggs then fought The Ultimate Fighter 2's Jason Von Flue, submitting him with a triangle choke.

Riggs' last UFC bout was on December 13, 2006, against Welterweight contender Diego Sanchez at UFC Fight Night 7. Riggs lost the fight due to knockout from a hook followed by a knee in 1:45 of the first round.

Following the fight with Sanchez, Riggs chose to go to the WEC and compete for the vacant WEC Middleweight Championship, but had to pull out of the fight the day before because of a recurring back injury.

Strikeforce
Riggs lost to Cory Devela via submission in his Strikeforce debut at Strikeforce: At The Dome.

Riggs was to return to action on Strikeforce: Melendez vs. Thomson, facing Jiujitsu specialist Luke Stewart.  Riggs stepped in as a late replacement for Shonie Carter, who was injured in training.  The fight was to be contested at a catchweight of 178 pounds.  However, he was denied licensure by the California State Athletic Commission after disclosing his recent use of prescription medication during the licensing process. Riggs lost to Kazuo Misaki at Strikeforce at the Playboy Mansion via controversial stoppage on September 20, 2008.

Riggs won his next fight at Strikeforce: Destruction on November 21, 2008, against Luke Stewart by TKO (Punches) in 2nd round 2:05. Riggs broke his hand throwing the first punch of the bout, but managed to rally in the second round, breaking Stewart's nose in the process.

Riggs next fought on the Strikeforce: Lawler vs. Shields card from the Scottrade Center in St. Louis, MO on June 6, 2009, against Phil "The New York Badass" Baroni in a three-round welterweight bout that won him the interim Strike Force Welter Weight title and that was broadcast live on the Showtime cable network.  In a performance that featured his versatile standup game, including several flying knees, Riggs won a unanimous decision over Baroni.

In his next fight, Riggs faced Jay Hieron on January 30, 2010, at Strikeforce: Miami. Riggs lost the fight via unanimous decision.

In the main event of Strikeforce Challengers: Riggs vs. Taylor, Riggs faced up and coming Middleweight Louis Taylor. "Diesel" won by submission due to strikes in the third round.

On December 9, 2010, it was announced that Riggs has parted ways with Strikeforce.

Bellator
About a month later, on January 10, 2011, Riggs signed with Bellator to fight in its Middleweight division. Riggs made his Bellator debut against Season 2 Middleweight Tournament Finalist Bryan Baker at Bellator 43. After a back and forth fight, Baker knocked Riggs out with a left hook late in the second round.

Independent promotions
Three months after his knockout loss to Baker at Bellator 43, In a rematch from their bout in 2004 Riggs fought The Ultimate Fighter 3 winner and fellow UFC veteran Kendall Grove. Grove quickly defeated Riggs by submission due to a guillotine choke, Thus avenging his previous loss to Riggs. For the first time in his ten-year career as a mixed martial artist Riggs has lost three straight fights.

After the loss to Grove he went on a five-fight win streak.

Fight Master: Bellator MMA
On May 6, 2013, it was announced that Riggs would be featured as a participant on Bellator's reality TV show Fight Master: Bellator MMA, competing as a Welterweight.

In his first fight to get into the house, Riggs defeated UK fighter Rob Mills via heel hook submission in the first round and subsequently chose to join Greg Jackson's team. In the preliminary round, Riggs defeated Eric Scallan via unanimous decision and went on to the quarterfinal round where he defeated Evan Cutts via unanimous decision. In the semifinal round, Riggs defeated number one seed Cole Williams in a three-round split decision victory. He made it to the tournament finals with Mike Bronzoulis.

Riggs was set to face Mike Bronzoulis in the Fight Master Finale on September 7, 2013 at Bellator 98. However, on September 3, it was revealed Riggs has sustained a significant eye injury and the bout was postponed indefinitely. The bout took place on November 2, 2013 at Bellator 106. Riggs won the fight via unanimous decision to become the first winner of Fight Master.

Return to UFC
After becoming the first winner of Fight Master, Riggs was expected to return to UFC and face Paulo Thiago at UFC Fight Night 51 on September 13, 2014, replacing an injured Mike Rhodes.  However, Riggs was forced to pull out of the fight after accidentally shooting himself in the hand and leg while cleaning a pistol at his home.

Riggs made his eventual return against Ben Saunders at UFC on Fox: dos Santos vs. Miocic on December 13, 2014 at US Airways Center in Phoenix, Arizona.
 The fight ended early in the first round by TKO due to injury when Riggs hurt his neck on a take down and tapped out shortly thereafter.

Joe Riggs faced Patrick Côté on April 25, 2015 at UFC 186. Riggs lost the back-and-forth fight by unanimous decision.

Riggs was expected to face Uriah Hall in a middleweight bout on August 8, 2015 at UFC Fight Night 73. However, Riggs pulled out of the fight in late July, citing an injury, and was replaced by promotional newcomer Oluwale Bamgbose.

Following a quick recovery, Riggs faced Ron Stallings on September 5, 2015 at UFC 191. Riggs won the bout via disqualification after Stallings landed an illegal upkick, which rendered Riggs unable to continue.

Riggs faced Chris Camozzi on February 21, 2016 at UFC Fight Night 83. He lost the fight via TKO in the first round due a series of knees by Camozzi, which broke the right forearm of Riggs.  On April 13, Riggs was released from the promotion.

Bare-knuckle boxing

BKB
Riggs recently started competing in Bare Knuckle Boxing matches under the UK based BKB promotion. He won a championship fight against Christian “Fat Boy“ Evans, an experienced bare knuckle fighter who had also been featured in the documentary "Bare Knuckle Fight Club" from Channel 4 news, by unanimous decision at BKB 4. Riggs was deducted 1 point in the first round for shooting for a take-down and taking his opponent to the mat, and was warned again in the same round after throwing an illegal elbow.

BKFC
Riggs signed with the BKFC in 2018 and made his promotional debut against Brok Weaver at BKFC 3: The Takeover on October 20, 2018. He won the bout via unanimous decision.

He made his sophomore appearance in the promotion against Heriberto Tovar at BKFC 4 on February 2, 2019. He won the fight via unanimous decision.

He then faced Walber Brito de Barros at BKFC 6 on June 22, 2019. The bout was ruled a unanimous draw.

Riggs was expected to headline BKFC 10 against fellow UFC veteran Héctor Lombard in February 2020. However, in January, the company announced that Lombard will be facing David Mundell, with no further information.

Riggs then faced Héctor Lombard for the inaugural BKFC Cruiserweight Championship at BKFC 18 on June 26, 2021. He lost the fight via fourth-round technical knockout.

Riggs faced Melvin Guillard at BKFC Fight Night: Montana on October 9, 2021. He won the fight via first-minute knockout.

Personal life
Joe and his wife had a son who died shortly after birth. They have another son.
Joe also has a daughter named Jadin who is 3 years younger than his son.

Championships and accomplishments
Bellator MMA
Fight Master: Bellator MMA Season One Winner
World Extreme Cagefighting
WEC Middleweight Championship (One time)
Ultimate Fighting Championship
Submission of the Night (One time) vs. Jason Von Flue
Z Promotions
Light Heavyweight Championship vs. Shonie Carter
Bare Knuckle Boxing™️
BKB Light Heavyweight World Championship

Mixed martial arts record

|-
| NC
| align=center| 49–18–1 (2) 
| George Sullivan
| NC (overturned)
| Ring of Combat 70
| 
| align=center|3
| align=center|2:08
| Atlantic City, New Jersey, United States
|
|-
| Win
| align=center| 49–18–1 (1) 
| Dan Yates
| TKO (submission to punches)
| KOP 63
| 
| align=center|1
| align=center|3:31
| Muskegon, Michigan, United States
|
|-
| Loss
| align=center| 48–18–1 (1) 
| Artem Frolov
| TKO (knee injury)
| M-1 Challenge 93: Shlemenko vs. Silva
| 
| align=center|2
| align=center|0:46
| Chelyabinsk, Russia
|
|-
| Draw
| align=center|  (1) 
| Borys Polezhai
| Draw (split)
| M-1 Challenge 90: Kunchenko vs. Butenko
| 
| align=center|3
| align=center|5:00
| St. Petersburg, Russia
|
|-
| Win
| align=center| 48–17 (1) 
| Erick Lozano
| TKO (punches)
| KOP 60
| 
| align=center|2
| align=center|N/A
| Grand Rapids, Michigan, United States
|
|-
| Win
| align=center| 47–17 (1) 
| Oleg Olenichev
| TKO (punches)
| M-1 Challenge 84: Kunchenko vs. Romanov
| 
| align=center|3
| align=center|3:21
| Saint Petersburg, Russia
|
|-
| Win
| align=center| 46–17 (1)
| Shonie Carter
| TKO (punches)
| Z Promotions: Fight Night Medicine Hat 4
| 
| align=center| 2
| align=center| 4:54
| Medicine Hat, Alberta, Canada
| 
|-
| Win
| align=center| 45–17 (1) 
| Dmitry Samoilov
| TKO (punches)
| M-1 Challenge 81: Battle in the Mountains 6
| 
| align=center|3
| align=center|1:24
| Nazran, Ingushetia, Russia
|
|-
|Win
| align=center| 44–17 (1) 
| Jerome Jones
| TKO (punches)
| WXC 68
| 
| align=center|1
| align=center|0:27
| Ypsilanti, Michigan, United States
|
|-
| Win
| align=center| 43–17–(1) 
| Billy Martin
| TKO (punches)
| ICF 27: The Last Stand
| 
| align=center|1
| align=center|1:48
| Great Falls, Montana, United States
| 
|-
|Win
| align=center| 42–17 (1) 
| Cody McKenzie
| TKO (submission to punches)
| Z Promotions: Fight Night Medicine Hat 2
| 
| align=center|1
| align=center|1:51
| Medicine Hat, Alberta, Canada 
|
|
|-
|Loss
|align=center|41–17 (1) 
|Chris Camozzi
|TKO (knees)
|UFC Fight Night: Cowboy vs. Cowboy
|
|align=center|1
|align=center|0:26
|Pittsburgh, Pennsylvania, United States
|
|-
| Win
| align=center| 41–16 (1) 
| Ron Stallings
| DQ (illegal upkick)
| UFC 191
| 
| align=center|2
| align=center|2:28
| Las Vegas, Nevada, United States
| 
|-
|  Loss
| align=center| 40–16 (1)
| Patrick Côté
| Decision (unanimous)
| UFC 186
| 
| align=center| 3
| align=center| 5:00
| Montreal, Quebec, Canada
| 
|-
| Loss
| align=center| 40–15 (1)
| Ben Saunders
| TKO (neck injury)
| UFC on Fox: dos Santos vs. Miocic
| 
| align=center| 1
| align=center| 0:57
| Phoenix, Arizona, United States
| 
|-
| Win
| align=center| 40–14 (1)
| Mike Bronzoulis
| Decision (unanimous)
| Bellator 106
| 
| align=center| 3
| align=center| 5:00
| Long Beach, California, United States
| 
|-
| Win
| align=center| 39–14 (1)
| Cris Leyva
| TKO (punches)
| RITC 164
| 
| align=center| 1
| align=center| 2:28
| Chandler, Arizona, United States
| 
|-
| Win
| align=center| 38–14 (1)
| Josh Cavan 
| KO (punches)
| Made For War 1
| 
| align=center| 1
| align=center| 4:16
| Castle Rock, Colorado, United States
| 
|-
| Win
| align=center| 37–14 (1)
| Shane Johnson
| KO (punch)	
| RITC 160
| 
| align=center| 2
| align=center| 2:33
| Chandler, Arizona, United States
| 
|-
| Win
| align=center| 36–14 (1)
| Aaron Brink
| Submission (armbar)
| RITC 159
| 
| align=center| 2
| align=center| 1:18
| Chandler, Arizona, United States
| 
|-
| Win
| align=center| 35–14 (1)
| Shannon Ritch
| TKO (punches)
| Duel for Domination
| 
| align=center| 1
| align=center| 0:56
| Phoenix, Arizona, United States
| 
|-
| Loss
| align=center| 34–14 (1)
| Kendall Grove
| Submission (guillotine choke)
| ProElite 1
| 
| align=center| 1
| align=center| 0:59
| Honolulu, Hawaii, United States
| 
|-
| Loss
| align=center| 34–13 (1)
| Bryan Baker
| KO (punch)
| Bellator 43
| 
| align=center| 2
| align=center| 3:53
| Newkirk, Oklahoma, United States
| 
|-
| Loss
| align=center| 34–12 (1)
| Jordan Mein
| TKO (punches)
| Wreck MMA: Strong & Proud
| 
| align=center| 2
| align=center| 4:30
| Gatineau, Quebec, Canada
| 
|-
| Win
| align=center| 34–11 (1)
| Trent Thorne
| TKO (elbows)
| KOTC: 48
| 
| align=center| 1
| align=center| 3:56
| Edmonton, Alberta, Canada
| 
|-
| Win
| align=center| 33–11 (1)
| Louis Taylor
| TKO (submission to punches)
| Strikeforce Challengers: Riggs vs. Taylor
| 
| align=center| 3
| align=center| 2:07
| Phoenix, Arizona, United States
| 
|-
| Loss
| align=center| 32–11 (1)
| Jay Hieron
| Decision (unanimous)
| Strikeforce: Miami
| 
| align=center| 3
| align=center| 5:00
| Sunrise, Florida, United States
| 
|-
| Win
| align=center| 32–10 (1)
| Nick Almen
| TKO (submission to punches and elbows)
| Ironman MMA 1
| 
| align=center| 1
| align=center| 1:51
| Welch, Minnesota, United States
| 
|-
| Win
| align=center| 31–10 (1)
| David Barnes
| TKO (punches)
| RITC 138
| 
| align=center| 1
| align=center| 0:57
| Mesa, Arizona, United States
| 
|-
| Win
| align=center| 30–10 (1)
| Phil Baroni
| Decision (unanimous)
| Strikeforce: Lawler vs. Shields
| 
| align=center| 3
| align=center| 5:00
| St. Louis, Missouri, United States
| 
|-
| Win
| align=center| 29–10 (1)
| Luke Stewart
| TKO (punches)
| Strikeforce: Destruction
| 
| align=center| 2
| align=center| 2:05
| San Jose, California, United States
| 
|-
| Loss
| align=center| 28–10 (1)
| Kazuo Misaki
| TKO (punches)
| Strikeforce: At The Mansion II
| 
| align=center| 2
| align=center| 2:29
| Beverly Hills, California, United States
| 
|-
| Win
| align=center| 28–9 (1)
| Matt Dempsey
| Submission (rear-naked choke)
| RITC 112
| 
| align=center| 2
| align=center| 1:47
| Prescott, Arizona, United States
| 
|-
| Loss
| align=center| 27–9 (1)
| Cory Devela
| TKO (slam)
| Strikeforce: At The Dome
| 
| align=center| 1
| align=center| 1:22
| Tacoma, Washington, United States
| 
|-
| Win
| align=center| 27–8 (1)
| Eugene Jackson
| KO (punches)
| Strikeforce: Playboy Mansion
| 
| align=center| 1
| align=center| 3:56
| Beverly Hills, California, United States
| 
|-
| Win
| align=center| 26–8 (1)
| Dan Chambers
| Submission (triangle choke)
| Hardcore Championship Fighting: Unfinished Business
| 
| align=center| 1
| align=center| 3:25
| Edmonton, Alberta, Canada
| 
|-
| Loss
| align=center| 25–8 (1)
| Diego Sanchez
| KO (knee)
| UFC Fight Night: Sanchez vs. Riggs
| 
| align=center| 1
| align=center| 1:45
| San Diego, California, United States
| 
|-
| Win
| align=center| 25–7 (1)
| Jason Von Flue
| Submission (triangle choke)
| UFC Fight Night 6
| 
| align=center| 1
| align=center| 2:01
| Las Vegas, Nevada, United States
|  
|-
| Loss
| align=center| 24–7 (1)
| Mike Swick
| Submission (guillotine choke)
| UFC 60
| 
| align=center| 1
| align=center| 2:19
| Los Angeles, California, United States
| 
|-
| Win
| align=center| 24–6 (1)
| Nick Diaz
| Decision (unanimous)
| UFC 57
| 
| align=center| 3
| align=center| 5:00
| Las Vegas, Nevada, United States
| 
|-
| Loss
| align=center| 23–6 (1)
| Matt Hughes
| Submission (kimura)
| UFC 56
| 
| align=center| 1
| align=center| 3:28
| Las Vegas, Nevada, United States
| 
|-
| Win
| align=center| 23–5 (1)
| Chris Lytle
| TKO (doctor stoppage)
| UFC 55
| 
| align=center| 2
| align=center| 2:00
| Uncasville, Connecticut, United States
| 
|-
| Win
| align=center| 22–5 (1)
| Rob Kimmons
| TKO (submission to punches)
| WEC 15
| 
| align=center| 1
| align=center| 1:24
| Lemoore, California, United States
| 
|-
| Loss
| align=center| 21–5 (1)
| Ivan Salaverry
| Submission (triangle choke)
| UFC 52
| 
| align=center| 1
| align=center| 2:42
| Las Vegas, Nevada, United States
| 
|-
| Win
| align=center| 21–4 (1)
| Thomas Gil
| Submission (armbar)
| RITC 66
| 
| align=center| 1
| align=center| 2:05
| Phoenix, Arizona, United States
| 
|-
| Win
| align=center| 20–4 (1)
| Isidro Gonzalez
| TKO (punches and elbows)
| WEC 12
| 
| align=center| 1
| align=center| 1:50
| Lemoore, California, United States
| 
|-
| Win
| align=center| 19–4 (1)
| Joe Doerksen
| TKO (submission to elbows)
| UFC 49
| 
| align=center| 2
| align=center| 3:37
| Las Vegas, Nevada, United States
| 
|-
| Win
| align=center| 18–4 (1)
| Shane Johnson
| KO (punches)
| XCF 5: Evolution
| 
| align=center| 1
| align=center| N/A
| Phoenix, Arizona, United States
| 
|-
| Win
| align=center| 17–4 (1)
| Kendall Grove
| KO (elbows)
| Rumble on the Rock 5
| 
| align=center| 1
| align=center| 3:09
| Honolulu, Hawaii, United States
| 
|-
| Win
| align=center| 16–4 (1)
| Dave Vitkay
| KO (punches)
| ICC: Trials 2
| 
| align=center| 1
| align=center| N/A
| Minnesota, United States
| 
|-
| Win
| align=center| 15–4 (1)
| John Renken
| KO (punch)
| RITC 60: 'The Saint' Goes Marching In
| 
| align=center| 1
| align=center| 0:28
| Phoenix, Arizona, United States
| 
|-
| Win
| align=center| 14–4 (1)
| Chris Kiever
| KO (punch)
| IFC: Battleground Tahoe
| 
| align=center| 1
| align=center| 0:49
| Lake Tahoe, Nevada, United States
| 
|-
| Loss
| align=center| 13–4 (1)
| Alex Stiebling
| Submission (triangle choke)
| WEC 9
| 
| align=center| 2
| align=center| 1:54
| Lemoore, California, United States
| 
|-
| Win
| align=center| 13–3 (1)
| Cory Timmerman
| Submission (armbar)
| RITC 57: Tucson Revisited
| 
| align=center| 1
| align=center| 1:11
| Tucson, Arizona, United States
| 
|-
| Win
| align=center| 12–3 (1)
| Frank Alcala
| TKO (punches)
| IFC: Rumble on the Rio
| 
| align=center| 1
| align=center| 0:31
| Hidalgo, Texas, United States
| 
|-
| NC
| align=center| 11–3 (1)
| Andy Montana
| No Contest
| RITC 53: The Beat Goes On
| 
| align=center| N/A
| align=center| N/A
| Phoenix, Arizona, United States
| 
|-
| Win
| align=center| 11–3
| Greg Wikan
| TKO (corner stoppage)
| ECS: Evolution
| 
| align=center| 3
| align=center| 5:00
| Phoenix, Arizona, United States
| 
|-
| Win
| align=center| 10–3
| Will Hammond
| TKO (punches)
| Art of War 2
| 
| align=center| 1
| align=center| N/A
| Kalispell, Montana, United States
| 
|-
| Loss
| align=center| 9–3
| Travis Fulton
| Submission (choke)
| RITC 45: Finally
| 
| align=center| 1
| align=center| 0:48
| Phoenix, Arizona, United States
| 
|-
| Win
| align=center| 9–2
| Herb Dean
| TKO (submission to punches)
| RITC 43: The Match
| 
| align=center| 1
| align=center| 0:52
| Phoenix, Arizona, United States
| 
|-
| Loss
| align=center| 8–2
| Wesley Correira
| KO (knee and punch)
| Rumble on the Rock 1
| 
| align=center| 2
| align=center| 2:07
| Honolulu, Hawaii, United States
| 
|-
| Win
| align=center| 8–1
| Lemuel Vincent
| TKO (punches)
| RITC 42: Road Trip
| 
| align=center| 1
| align=center| 0:23
| Phoenix, Arizona, United States
| 
|-
| Win
| align=center| 7–1
| Allan Sullivan
| Submission (armbar)
| RITC 39: Bring It
| 
| align=center| 3
| align=center| 1:57
| Phoenix, Arizona, United States
| 
|-
| Win
| align=center| 6–1
| Joe Pardo
| Decision (unanimous)
| RITC 38: Let's Roll
| 
| align=center| 3
| align=center| 3:00
| Phoenix, Arizona, United States
| 
|-
| Win
| align=center| 5–1
| Jess Morton
| TKO (retirement)
| RITC 36: The Rematch
| 
| align=center| 1
| align=center| 3:00
| Phoenix, Arizona, United States
| 
|-
| Win
| align=center| 4–1
| Andy Montana
| TKO (submission to punches)
| RITC 35: This Time It's Personal
| 
| align=center| 1
| align=center| 1:24
| Phoenix, Arizona, United States
| 
|-
| Loss
| align=center| 3–1
| Homer Moore
| Decision (unanimous)
| RITC 34
| 
| align=center| 3
| align=center| 3:00
| Phoenix, Arizona, United States
| 
|-
| Win
| align=center| 3–0
| Joey Vigueria
| TKO (submission to punches)
| RITC 33: The Big Show
| 
| align=center| 1
| align=center| 2:00
| Phoenix, Arizona, United States
| 
|-
| Win
| align=center| 2–0
| Justin Lyon
| TKO (submission to punches)
| RITC 31
| 
| align=center| 1
| align=center| 0:33
| Phoenix, Arizona, United States
| 
|-
| Win
| align=center| 1–0
| Ryan Roath
| TKO (submission to punches)
| RITC 30: Soaring to New Heights
| 
| align=center| 1
| align=center| 2:32
| Phoenix, Arizona, United States
|

Mixed martial arts exhibition record

|-
| Win
| align=center| 4–0
| Cole Williams
| Decision (split) 
| Fight Master: Bellator MMA
| 
| align=center| 3
| align=center| 5:00
| New Orleans, Louisiana, United States
| 
|-
| Win
| align=center| 3–0
| Evan Cutts
| Decision (unanimous) 
| Fight Master: Bellator MMA
| 
| align=center| 2
| align=center| 5:00
| New Orleans, Louisiana, United States
| 
|-
| Win
| align=center| 2–0
| Eric Scanlan
| Decision (unanimous) 
| Fight Master: Bellator MMA
| 
| align=center| 2
| align=center| 5:00
| New Orleans, Louisiana, United States
| 
|-
| Win
| align=center| 1–0
| Rob Mills
| Submission (heel hook)
| Fight Master: Bellator MMA
| 
| align=center| 1
| align=center| 4:31
| New Orleans, Louisiana, United States
|

Bare-knuckle boxing record

|-
|Loss
|align=center|4–2–1
|Lorenzo Hunt
|KO (punches)
|BKFC 24
|
|align=center|2
|align=center|1:12
|Great Falls, Montana, USA
|
|-
|Win
|align=center|4–1–1
|Melvin Guillard
|KO (punch)
|BKFC Fight Night: Montana
|
|align=center|1
|align=center|0:59
|Billings, Montana, United States
|
|-
|Loss
|align=center|3–1–1
|Héctor Lombard
|TKO (doctor stoppage)
|BKFC 18
|
|align=center|4
|align=center|1:07
|Miami, Florida, USA
|
|-
|Draw
|align=center|3–0–1
|Walber Barros
|Draw (unanimous)
|BKFC 6: Malignaggi vs. Lobov
|
|align=center|5
|align=center|2:00
|Tampa, Florida, USA
|
|- 
|Win
|align=center|3–0
|Heriberto Tovar
|Decision (unanimous)
|BKFC 4: USA vs. Mexico
|
|align=center|5
|align=center|2:00
|Cancun, Mexico
|
|- 
|Win
|align=center|2–0
|Brok Weaver
|Decision (unanimous)
|BKFC 3: The Takeover
|
|align=center|5
|align=center|2:00
|Biloxi, Mississippi, USA
|
|- 
|Win
|align=center|1–0
|Christian Evans
|Decision (unanimous)
|BKB 4
|
|align=center|5
|align=center|2:00
|London, England
|

See also
 List of Bellator MMA alumni
 List of Strikeforce alumni
 List of male mixed martial artists

References

External links
 
 
 Strikeforce profile
 Knucklepit interview

1982 births
Living people
American male mixed martial artists
Heavyweight mixed martial artists
Light heavyweight mixed martial artists
Middleweight mixed martial artists
Welterweight mixed martial artists
Mixed martial artists utilizing collegiate wrestling
Mixed martial artists utilizing boxing
Mixed martial artists utilizing Brazilian jiu-jitsu
Ultimate Fighting Championship male fighters
Bare-knuckle boxers 
World Extreme Cagefighting champions
Mixed martial artists from Maine
Mixed martial artists from Arizona
American male sport wrestlers
Amateur wrestlers
American practitioners of Brazilian jiu-jitsu
People awarded a black belt in Brazilian jiu-jitsu
People from Sanford, Maine
Sportspeople from Phoenix, Arizona